Events from the year 1542 in art.

Events
Painter Paul Lautensack is expelled from Nuremberg as a result of his Reformist fanaticism.

Works

Paintings

 Wen Zhengming – Wintry trees after Li Cheng
 Titian 
Portrait of Clarissa Strozzi
Portrait of Ranuccio Farnese
 Bronzini – Crossing of the Red Sea
 Domenico Beccafumi – Madonna and Child with Infant John the Baptist

Births
date unknown - Joris Hoefnagel. Flemish painter and engraver (died 1601)
probable
Gillis Coignet, Flemish painter (died 1599)
Ambroise Dubois, Flemish painter of the second School of Fontainebleau (died 1614)
Felice Riccio, Italian painter (died 1605)
Andrea Vicentino, Italian Mannerist painter (died 1617)
Federico Zuccari, Italian Mannerist painter and architect (died 1609)

Deaths
date unknown
Dosso Dossi, Italian Renaissance painter who belonged to the Ferrara School of Painting (born 1490)
Hans Krafft the Elder, German medallist (born 1481)
Jan van Amstel, Dutch Northern Renaissance painter (born 1500)
probable
Francesco Xanto Avelli, Italian ceramicist (born 1487)
Vasco Fernandes, Portuguese Renaissance painter (born 1475)

 
Years of the 16th century in art